The siege of the Fukuryūji took place in 1183, and was a battle of the Genpei War, the great 12th-century Japanese civil war between the Taira clan and the Minamoto clan. Fukuryūji (福隆寺) was a fortress belonging to Seno Kaneyasu, a Taira partisan. Imai Kanehira led his men across muddy ricefields, under heavy archer fire, to take the fortress. The attackers were victorious, and Kaneyasu was killed.

References

1180s in Japan
1183 in Asia
Fukuryuji 1183
Fukuryuji 1183
Conflicts in 1183